Timber Bay is a northern hamlet located in Northern Saskatchewan on the east side of Montreal Lake. It was once on the main highway leading north from Prince Albert, Saskatchewan. Now the main highway, Highway 2, is on the western side of the lake. Consequently, the community is accessible by a gravel road but is only 20 minutes by car from the community of Montreal Lake. In September 1951, the first school in the area was opened in an old log building that was next to a small store and garage owned by Henry Fornier. The first teacher was Bernard McIntyre. Students were from the families named Beatty, Fornier, Pruden and Lee. In 1952, a school was established at its present site.

Demographics 

See also 
 List of communities in Northern Saskatchewan
 List of communities in Saskatchewan

References

Division No. 18, Saskatchewan
Northern hamlets in Saskatchewan